San Pier d'Isonzo is a town and comune in the province of Gorizia, northern Italy, near Turriaco.

Cities and towns in Friuli-Venezia Giulia